Christopher Smith (born January 31, 1988) is a professional Canadian football linebacker most recently for the Toronto Argonauts of the Canadian Football League. He was drafted 28th overall by the Winnipeg Blue Bombers in the 2010 CFL Draft. He played college football for the Queen's Golden Gaels.

References

External links
Just Sports Stats

1988 births
Living people
BC Lions players
Canadian football linebackers
Players of Canadian football from Ontario
Queen's Golden Gaels football players
Canadian football people from Toronto
Winnipeg Blue Bombers players
Toronto Argonauts players